Richard Eric Parry Winpenny is a British chemist and a professor in the Department of Chemistry at the University of Manchester. Winpenny's research is within the fields of inorganic chemistry and magnetochemistry, specifically the areas of single-molecule magnetism, inorganic synthesis, supramolecular chemistry and polymetallic caged complexes.

Education 
Winpenny was educated at Sandfields Comprehensive School, Port Talbot, where he was influenced by his excellent chemistry teachers, John Hardie and Vivien Davies, to study chemistry at university. He thus completed both his Bachelor of Science and Doctor of Philosophy degree at Imperial College London in 1985 and 1988 respectively. His PhD on New heterometallic polynuclear complexes was supervised by David Goodgame.

Research and career 
Upon completing his PhD, Winpenny completed his postdoctoral research with John Fackler, Jr at Texas A&M University from 1988 to 1989 where he researched on mass spectrometry of gold clusters. In 1990, he joined the University of Edinburgh as an academic, and in 2000, moved to The University of Manchester as the chair of inorganic chemistry.

Winpenny was the Associate Dean for Research in the University of Manchester Faculty of Science and Engineering from September 2008 to April 2010. He was also the director of the Photon Science Institute from October 2009 to April 2014. Winpenny was also the head of the Department of Chemistry at the University of Manchester from August 2014 to April 2018, and is the director and chief scientific officer at Sci-Tron(Ltd.). He was also awarded Engineering and Physical Sciences Research Council (EPSRC) Established Career Fellowship (January 2018 to December 2022) and also holds a European Research Council Advanced Fellowship from September 2018 to August 2022.

Notable work 
Winpenny is classed as one of the leading synthetic chemists of polymetallic cage complexes. He has developed a wide range of heterometallic rings as a new class of molecular magnets, which have been exploited to develop new physics and techniques with proposals to use them in quantum information processing. These rings also show unique capabilities to act as resist materials for electron beam lithography (EBL).

A wide range of literature has been published by Winpenny on the synthesis, structural and property analysis of heterometallic rings, polymetallic cages, single molecule magnets, and f-block and d-block metal complexes. The published work by Winpenny has gained more than 24,000 citations as of 2020.

In 2007, Winpenny also reported the first intrinsic spin-lattice (T1) and phasecoherence (T2) relaxation times in molecular nanomagnets. The results showed that the value of T2 in deuterated samples were of several orders of magnitude longer than the duration of spin manipulations which satisfies the prerequisite for the deployment of molecular nanomagnets in quantum information applications.

In 2016, a research led by Winpenny, Nicholas F. Chilton and Yan‐Zhen Zheng was able to report a monometallic dysprosium complex which showed the largest effective energy barrier to magnetic relaxation of Ueff = 1815 K. The research also showed the largest blocking temperature (TB) for a monometallic complex.

Awards and nominations 
 RSC Prize for Emerging Technologies in the area of materials (2016) 
 Ludwig Mond Award (2016)
 Fellow of the Learned Society of Wales (2016)
 Tilden Prize (2011)
 Royal Society Wolfson Merit Award (2009)

Major reviews and publications

References

External links
  at University of Manchester

Living people
British chemists
Academics of the University of Manchester
21st-century chemists
Alumni of Imperial College London
Date of birth missing (living people)
Year of birth missing (living people)